La tigre dei sette mari, internationally released as Tiger of the Seven Seas, is a 1962 Italian adventure film directed by Luigi Capuano.

It was a sequel to Queen of the Pirates.

Plot    
Consuelo is the daughter of the famous pirate nicknamed the Tiger. When he feels tired and decides to leave the command of the ship, he chooses to give it to the winner of a challenge among his men, but unexpectedly, Consuelo wins. The same night Tiger is killed, William is charged with the killing and is sentenced to death. 

But before the sentence could be executed, the Spaniards of Grand Duke Inigo arrives. Consuelo and William escape, and after an initial distrust between the two, they come together after discovering that William was falsely blamed to take revenge on the traitor and recover the treasure of the Tiger.

Cast 
 Gianna Maria Canale as Consuelo
 Anthony Steel as William Scott 
 Maria Grazia Spina as Anna de Cordoba 
 Ernesto Calindri as Inigo de Cordoba 
 Andrea Aureli as Robert
 Carlo Ninchi as Tiger 
 John Kitzmiller as Serpente 
 Carlo Pisacane as Pirate
 Nazzareno Zamperla as Rick

Production
Anthony Steel had recently settled permanently in Italy.

Reception
Monthly Film Bulletin called it "a dull, mechanical affair."

Filmink said Steel "is the male lead for pirate queen Gianna Maria Canale, who beats him in a sword duel and has to rescue him later. Which is surprisingly and enjoyably feminist but presumably helped further dint Steel’s already-fragile ego. Incidentally, the film indicates that the actor’s physical appearance was starting to disintegrate – he was still handsome with all his hair and no gut, but his face was appearing increasingly gaunt and tired."

References

External links

Tiger of the Seven Seas at TCMDB
Tiger of the Seven Seas at Letterbox DVD

1962 films
1960s historical adventure films
Films directed by Luigi Capuano
Films scored by Carlo Rustichelli
Pirate films
Italian historical adventure films
1960s Italian-language films
1960s Italian films